Rugby union is a popular sport in the British Isles (Great Britain and Ireland), including England, Wales, Scotland and Ireland. The game was arguably invented in 1823 by William Webb Ellis, and in 1871 the English Rugby Football Union was the first national rugby football union to be founded. It is organised separately in each of these countries, and also on an all-Ireland basis.

Rugby union in the British Isles is discussed in the following articles, corresponding to the separate organisations governing the sport:

 Rugby union in England
 Rugby union in Ireland
 Rugby union in Scotland
 Rugby union in Wales

And also in the Crown Dependencies:
 Rugby union in Guernsey
 Rugby union in Jersey
 Rugby union in the Isle of Man

And also in various British Overseas Territories:
 Rugby union in Anguilla
 Rugby union in the Cayman Islands
 Rugby union in Gibraltar
 Rugby union in the British Virgin Islands

However areas where the sport is similar between the Home Nations will be discussed in this article.

National team

Men's

Unlike in rugby league, no combined British and Irish national rugby union team has ever competed in a major tournament such as the Rugby World Cup. Instead, the British & Irish Lions go on tours to the traditional Southern Hemisphere nations of Australia, New Zealand and South Africa, currently occurring on a four-year cycle; the first was an 1888 tour to New Zealand and Australia. The team also plays in select one-off matches as preparation for the tour test series.

In major competition the Home Nations represent themselves as:
England national rugby union team
Scotland national rugby union team
Wales national rugby union team
Ireland national rugby union team

Women's

There is also a unified Great Britain women's national rugby union team; however, in most cases, women's rugby also sees the Home Nations represented individually by:
England women's national rugby union team
Scotland women's national rugby union team
Wales women's national rugby union team
Ireland women's national rugby union team

Domestic competitions
The Home Nations run individual competition across four league systems:

English rugby union system
Scottish rugby union system
Welsh rugby union system
Irish rugby union system

Stadiums

Each national team has their own national stadium:

Twickenham Stadium for England
Murrayfield Stadium for Scotland
Millennium Stadium for Wales
Aviva Stadium for Ireland

Tournaments hosted
XV

Sevens

Rugby Sevens
Rugby Sevens is a version of Rugby Union played with seven players per side instead of the usual fifteen. The home nations field individual national teams however the, what could be considered the United Kingdom's greatest achievement in the sport came in the 2016 Summer Olympics, as two united Great Britain teams competed in the inaugural edition of the sport's tornement at the Summer Olympics. The Great Britain teams were formed only ten weeks prior to the  games and saw the men's team reach the final achieving a runners up place, and the women's team achieved fourth.

National teams
Great Britain
Great Britain national rugby sevens team
Great Britain women's national rugby sevens team
Home nations
England national rugby sevens team
England women's national rugby sevens team
Scotland national rugby sevens team
Scotland women's national rugby sevens team
Wales national rugby sevens team
Wales women's national rugby sevens team
Ireland national rugby sevens team
Ireland women's national rugby sevens team

See also
 British & Irish Lions
 Rugby league in the British Isles

Notes

References

1823 establishments in the United Kingdom
 
Sport in the British Isles